is a Japanese singer, voice actor and actor from Yamanashi Prefecture. He is famous for singing the theme songs of Guyver, Kamen Rider Agito and Kyuukyuu Sentai GoGo-V, among other theme songs as well as the entire soundtrack to Juukou B-Fighter.

Filmography

Television animation
Bikkuriman 2000 (1999) (Shikakukabin)

Original video animation (OVA)
Babel II (1992) (Wang)

Dubbing

Live-action
Mars Attacks! (Tom Jones)

Animation
The Pebble and the Penguin (Hubie)
Tangled (Big Nose Thug)

References

External links
 Shinichi Ishihara at GamePlaza-Haruka Voice Acting Database 

1960 births
Japanese male singers
Kamen Rider
Living people
Musicians from Yamanashi Prefecture
Anime musicians